Grosso v. Miramax Film Corp., 383 F.3d 965 (9th Cir. 2004), was an entertainment law case in which the United States Court of Appeals for the Ninth Circuit held that a screenwriter's claim for breach of implied contract was not preempted  by United States federal copyright law, because the screenwriter's claim alleged an extra element that transformed the action from one arising under the ambit of the federal copyright statute to one sounding in contract.

Facts 
Jeff Grosso, the author of a screenplay entitled "The Shell Game," claimed that Miramax stole the ideas and themes of his work when it made the movie "Rounders."

Issue 
Did the District Court properly dismiss Grosso's state law causes of action for breach of contract as preempted by the federal Copyright Act?

Result 
The Ninth Circuit found that the District Court erred in concluding that a screenwriter's claim for breach of implied contract was preempted by Federal Copyright Law.  In so holding, the Court reasoned that Grosso's claim alleged an extra element that transformed the action from one arising under the ambit of the federal copyright statute to one sounding in contract.
After remand to the California state courts, Grosso's implied contract claim was found to be without merit.  Summary judgment was entered against Grosso.  On appeal, the California Court of Appeal, Second Appellate District, affirmed the summary judgment, and awarded the defendants their costs of suit.

References

External links
 
 

United States Court of Appeals for the Ninth Circuit cases
United States copyright case law
United States Internet case law
2004 in United States case law